Sergio Reis Silva (born c. 1968), a.k.a. maestro Sany Pitbull, is a Brazilian favela musician from Rio de Janeiro suburb São Cristóvão, produced many of the dance style baile funk artists since 1986.

DJing for 20 years at independent sound teams of Rio like A Cova, Águia Disco, Live, and Pitbull, Sany is responsible for the new nominations for the Rio dance style, called "Post Baile Funk" after his performances in Europe late 2006 by journalists such as Daniel Haaksman from Germany and Hermano Vianna from Brazil.

References

External links
Interview by Timo Santala in English, January 12, 2007
Review by Hermano Vianna in Portuguese, April 3, 2007
Video by Adriana Pittigliani, April 9, 2007
Interview by Sabrina Fidalgo in Italian, July, 2007
Review by Bruno Maia in Portuguese, October 5, 2007
Review by Bruno Maia in Portuguese, October 22, 2007
Article by Phillipe Masala in French and English, December 1, 2007
MySpace: Sany Pitbull
MySpace: Carioca Funk Clube

1970s births
Living people
Brazilian DJs
Musicians from Rio de Janeiro (city)